Alex Marszalkowski (born February 22, 1987) is a member of the Rhode Island House of Representatives. A member of the Democratic Party, Marszalkowski represents the 52nd district. First elected in 2016, Marszalkowski currently serves as Deputy Majority Leader of the Rhode Island house. In 2020, Marszalkowski won re-election against Republican Chris Hogan and Independent Daniel Baglini.

Marszalkowski graduated from Mount St. Charles Academy in 2005, Roger Williams University with a bachelor's degree in history and psychology before graduating from the Roger Williams University School of Law in 2012.

References

Democratic Party members of the Rhode Island House of Representatives
Living people
Year of birth uncertain
1987 births
Mount Saint Charles Academy alumni
Roger Williams University School of Law alumni
21st-century American politicians